Jacques Decaux (9 March 1918 – 2003) was a French sports shooter. He competed in the 25 metre pistol event at the 1960 Summer Olympics.

References

1918 births
2003 deaths
French male sport shooters
Olympic shooters of France
Shooters at the 1960 Summer Olympics
People from Aigle District